Transversotrema is a genus of trematodes in the family Transversotrematidae.

Species
Transversotrema atkinsoni Hunter & Cribb, 2012
Transversotrema borboleta Hunter & Cribb, 2012
Transversotrema cabrarum Hunter, Hall & Cribb, 2012
Transversotrema cardinalis Hunter & Cribb, 2012
Transversotrema carmenae Hunter & Cribb, 2012
Transversotrema chauhani Agrawal & Singh, 1981
Transversotrema chevrarum Hunter, Hall & Cribb, 2012
Transversotrema cutmorei Hunter, Hall & Cribb, 2012
Transversotrema damsella Hunter & Cribb, 2012
Transversotrema elegans Hunter, Ingram, Adlard, Bray & Cribb, 2010
Transversotrema espanola Hunter & Cribb, 2012
Transversotrema fusilieri Hunter & Cribb, 2012
Transversotrema giganticum Hunter, Ingram, Adlard, Bray & Cribb, 2010
Transversotrema haasi Witenberg, 1944
Transversotrema hunterae Cutmore, Diggles & Cribb, 2016
Transversotrema lacerta Hunter, Ingram, Adlard, Bray & Cribb, 2010
Transversotrema licinum Manter, 1970
Transversotrema manteri Hunter & Cribb, 2012
Transversotrema novum Hunter & Cribb, 2012
Transversotrema patialense (Soparkar, 1924) Crusz & Sathananthan, 1960
Transversotrema polynesiae Cribb, Adlard, Bray, Sasal & Cutmore, 2014
Transversotrema tragorum Hunter, Hall & Cribb, 2012
Transversotrema witenbergi Hunter & Cribb, 2012

References

Plagiorchiida